Qezlar Qaleh Si castle is a historical castle located in Zanjan County in Zanjan Province, The longevity of this fortress dates back to the 6th and 7th centuries AH.

References 

Castles in Iran